The Great Triumvirate, in a golfing context, refers to the three leading British golfers of the late 19th and early 20th centuries: Harry Vardon, John Henry Taylor, and James Braid.   The trio combined to win The Open Championship 16 times in the 21 tournaments held between 1894 and 1914;  Vardon won six times with Braid and Taylor winning five apiece. In the five tournaments in this span the triumvirate did not win, one or more of them finished runner-up.

Open Championship – other winners 1894–1914

References

Golf terminology
British male golfers